Jean-François "J. F." Jacques (born April 29, 1985) is a Canadian professional ice hockey left winger. He is currently an unrestricted free agent who most recently played for HC Pustertal Wölfe of the Alps Hockey League. Jacques was selected by the Edmonton Oilers in the second round (68th overall) of the 2003 NHL Entry Draft.

Playing career
As a youth, Jacques played in the 1999 Quebec International Pee-Wee Hockey Tournament with a minor ice hockey team from Lanaudière.

Jacques played for four seasons with the Baie-Comeau Drakkar of the Quebec Major Junior Hockey League (QMJHL). At the 2003 NHL Entry Draft, the Edmonton Oilers traded first round picks with the New Jersey Devils, giving up their 17th overall position to the Devils (who then drafted Zach Parise) in exchange for the 22nd overall pick (Oilers drafted Marc-Antoine Pouliot) and the 68th overall pick which was used by the Oilers to select Jacques. He made his professional debut with the Edmonton Road Runners of the American Hockey League (AHL) in 2004–05, appearing in six games as a late-season call-up.

Following Oilers training camp for the 2005–06 season, Jacques was assigned to the Hamilton Bulldogs of the AHL. where he played the first half of the season. He was recalled to the Oilers to replace injured forward Ethan Moreau, making his NHL debut on February 2, 2006 against the Columbus Blue Jackets.

Jacques broke through and began the 2009–10 season with a regular spot on the Oilers' checking line. On November 3, 2010, the Oilers assigned him to their AHL affiliate, the Oklahoma City Barons for conditioning.

On September 24, 2011, Jacques was suspended for the remainder of the pre-season and the first five games of the regular season due to leaving the bench to initiate a fight with Mike Duco of the Vancouver Canucks.

On July 5, 2012, Jacques signed a one-year, two-way deal with the Florida Panthers. He was directly assigned to start the 2012–13 season with affiliate, the San Antonio Rampage, due to the 2012 NHL lockout. Failing to establish a defined role with the Rampage, Jacques was traded by the Panthers to the Tampa Bay Lightning for future considerations on January 21, 2013.

On August 16, 2013, Jacques signed a PTO with the Springfield Falcons of the American Hockey League.

On June 23, 2014, the Klagenfurter AC of the Austrian Hockey League signed Jacques as a free agent on a two-year deal, beginning in the 2014–15 season.

At the conclusion of his contract with KAC, Jacques left as a free agent to sign in the neighbouring German league, agreeing to a one-year deal with ERC Ingolstadt of the Deutsche Eishockey Liga on August 22, 2016. In the 2016–17 campaign, Jacques was unable to translate his scoring rate from the EBEL, posting 9 goals and 16 points in 52 games before suffering a preliminary playoff loss to the Fischtown Pinguins to conclude his tenure with ERC.

Career statistics

Regular season and playoffs

International

References

External links 

1985 births
Living people
Anaheim Ducks players
Baie-Comeau Drakkar players
Canadian ice hockey left wingers
Edmonton Oilers draft picks
Edmonton Oilers players
Edmonton Road Runners players
ERC Ingolstadt players
French Quebecers
Hamilton Bulldogs (AHL) players
HC Pustertal Wölfe players
Ice hockey people from Quebec
EC KAC players
Oklahoma City Barons players
People from Terrebonne, Quebec
San Antonio Rampage players
Springfield Falcons players
Syracuse Crunch players
Wilkes-Barre/Scranton Penguins players
Canadian expatriate ice hockey players in Austria
Canadian expatriate ice hockey players in Germany